Gone Are The Days is a semi-autobiographical novel written by Gaurav Sharma. The book was included in the IANS list of recommended books for young adults.

Publication

The first edition of  Gone Are The Days was published in 2016 by Kalpaz Publications. The book was well received among the youth in India.

Synopsis
A solitary boy named Gaurav experiences kaleidoscopic shifts in his initial life because of several mismatching events. The protagonist was born in a typical Punjabi Brahmin family and spent the most of his childhood in Sitamarhi, a small town of Bihar. After few years, Gaurav had to move to Delhi for his higher studies. The book runs in the flashback where the protagonist appears for his IELTS speaking test that would help him move to Canada for higher studies, and it is during the test he tells his story to the examiner.

References

Young adult novels
Novels set in Delhi
2016 Indian novels
Novels based on actual events
2016 debut novels